The year 1788 in architecture involved some significant events.

Buildings and structures

Buildings

 Felix Meritis in Amsterdam (Netherlands), designed by Jacob Otten Husly, is opened.
 De Kleine Komedie in Amsterdam, designed by Abraham van der Hart, is completed.
 Théâtre Graslin in Nantes (France), designed by Mathurin Crucy, is opened.
 Theater in der Josefstadt, Vienna is established.
 Theatre Royal in Richmond, North Yorkshire, England, is built.
 Sofia Albertina Church in Scania (Sweden), designed by Carl Hårleman before his death in 1753, is inaugurated.
 Capilla de Ánimas in Santiago de Compostela (Spain) is completed.
 St. Spyridon Church, Peroj (Croatia) is completed.
 St Gregory's Church, Preshome (Scotland), designed by Father John Reid, is built.
 Façade of St. Anne's Church, Warsaw, by Chrystian Piotr Aigner, is completed.
 Admiralty House, London, designed by Samuel Pepys Cockerell, is opened.
 Palazzo Beneventano del Bosco in Syracuse, Sicily, rebuilt by Luciano Alì, is completed.
 Arresødal on Zealand (Denmark) is completed.
 Eriksholm Castle on the Isefjord (Denmark), designed by Caspar Frederik Harsdorff, is completed.
 Sandbjerg in Jutland (Denmark) is built.
 Terraced houses in England at Camden Crescent, Bath and 32–44, Caledonia Place, Clifton, Bristol, designed by John Eveleigh, are built.
 Second Walton Bridge over the River Thames in England, designed by James Paine, is opened.

Births
 February 25 – Thomas Cubitt, English builder (died 1855)
 April 27 – Charles Robert Cockerell, English architect (died 1863)
 November – William Strickland, American architect (died 1854)

Deaths
 February 2 – James "Athenian" Stuart, English neoclassical architect (born 1733)
 September 27 – Sir Robert Taylor, English stonemason, sculptor and architect (born 1714)

References 

Architecture
Years in architecture
18th-century architecture